Pobladura may refer to:
Pobladura de Pelayo García, a municipality in the Spanish province of León
Pobladura de Valderaduey, a municipality in the Spanish province of Zamora
Pobladura del Valle, a municipality in the Spanish province of Zamora